"À force de prier" ("By Persistently Praying") is a song recorded in French by Greek singer Nana Mouskouri. The song was written by Raymond Bernard and Pierre Delanoë. It is best known as the  entry at the Eurovision Song Contest 1963, held in London.

Background
Mouskouri had had her international breakthrough with the German language single "Weiße Rosen aus Athen" ("White Roses from Athens") in 1961, a song originally adapted from a Greek folk melody. The song was later translated into several different languages and went on to become one of Mouskouri's signature tunes. When she received the offer to represent Luxembourg at the Eurovision Song Contest in early 1963 she and her family had recently relocated from Athens, Greece, to Paris, France, where she was signed to the Philips-Fontana label.

"À force de prier" is a ballad in French, with Mouskouri telling the object of her affections that she intends to have him love her "by persistently praying" for this to occur. Moskouri recorded her entry also in German (as "Die Worte dieser Nacht"), English ("The One That Got Away") and Italian ("La notte non lo sa").

Eurovision
Greece as a nation would not join the Contest until .

The song was performed sixteenth on the night, following 's Françoise Hardy with "L'amour s'en va". At the close of voting, it had received 13 points, placing 8th in a field of 16.

"À force de prier" was succeeded as Luxembourgish representative at the 1964 contest by Hugues Aufray with "Dès que le printemps revient".

After Eurovision
Although "À force de prier" was only a minor international success for Mouskouri, it won her the prestigious Grand Prix du Disque in France that same year, and her Eurovision appearance also caught the attention of noted French composer Michel Legrand, who went on to write and arrange two major hits for her in the Francophone markets; "Les parapluies de Cherbourg" (1964) and "L'enfant au tambour" (1965). The BBC, the host broadcaster of the contest, also noticed her talents and started to do specials with her afterwards.

Sources and external links
 Official Eurovision Song Contest site, history by year, 1963.
 Detailed info and lyrics, The Diggiloo Thrush, "À force de prier".
 [ Allmusic.com, Nana Mouskouri biography.]

Eurovision songs of Luxembourg
Eurovision songs of 1963
Songs written by Pierre Delanoë
Nana Mouskouri songs
1963 songs
Fontana Records singles
1963 singles